Inferno Metal Festival is an annual extreme metal festival that takes place every year during Easter in Oslo, Norway. The festival was founded by Borknagar guitarist Jens F. Ryland in cooperation with Radar Booking in 2001 and takes place at Rockefeller Music Hall.

Lineups

2023
The 2023 edition will take place at Rockefeller Music Hall from 6 to 9 April.
 Emperor
 Amorphis
 Watain
 Cannibal Corpse
 Abbath
 Dark Funeral
 Unleashed
 Nile
 Elder
 Arcturus
 Crowbar
 Godflesh
 Wolves in the Throne Room
 Uada
 Odium
 Sakis Tolis
 Harakiri for the Sky
 Urgehal
 Vemod
 Djevel
 Nekromantheon
 Mork

2022 
The 2022 edition replaced the 2020 edition, cancelled because of the COVID-19 pandemic.  It took place at Rockefeller Music Hall from 14 to 17 April.

The festival tried to keep the same lineup as for the 2020 cancelled edition. The announced lineup was:
 Mayhem
 Venom
 Kreator
 Triumph of Death
 Gorgoroth
 Marduk
 Ihsahn
 Kampfar
 Asphyx
 Bölzer
 Vreid
 Cadaver
 Dark Fortress
 Einherjer
 Djerv
 Asagraum
 Oranssi Pazuzu
 Myrkskog
 Benighted
 Sovereign
 Tulus
 Valkyrja
 Ved Buens Ende
 Hamferð
 Entombed A.D.
 From the Vastland
 Zifir
 Isvind

2020 
The 2020 edition was planned to place at Rockefeller Music Hall in  April 2020, but was cancelled and reported to April 2022 because of the COVID-19 pandemic.

2019 
The 2019 edition took place at Rockefeller Music Hall from 18. to 21. April.
 Taake
 1349
 Vomitory
 Gaahls Wyrd
 Hypocrisy
 Carach Angren
 Tribulation
 Misþyrming
 Archgoat
 The Ruins of Beverast
 Der Weg einer Freiheit
 The Black Dahlia Murder
 Avast
 Acârash
 Impaled Nazarene
 Mgła
 Dimmu Borgir
 Ragnarok
 Svarttjern
 Aura Noir
 Witchcraft
 Bloodbath
 Opeth

2018 
The 2018 edition took place at Rockefeller Music Hall from 29. March, to 1. April.
 Shining
 Dark Funeral
 Obituary
 Origin
 Emperor
 Fleshgod Apocalypse
 Ihsahn
 Satyricon
 Necrophobic
 Ahab
 Djevel
 Tsjuder
 Napalm Death
 Electric Wizard
 Carpathian Forest
 Grave
 Memoriam

2017 
The 2017 edition took place at Rockefeller Music Hall from 12. April (club night) Vulcan Arena , to 15. April.

 Abbath
 Befouled
 Carcass
 Gorgoroth
 Destruction
 Samael
 Belphegor
 Borknagar
 Primordial
 Red Harvest
 Tangorodrim
 Anaal Nathrakh
 Slagmaur
 Crowbar
 Furze

2016 
The 2016 edition took place at Rockefeller Music Hall from 23. April (club night), to 26. April.
 Mayhem
 Nile
 Marduk
 Exodus
 Sodom
 Vader
 Nifelheim
 ICS Vortex
 Blood Red Throne
 Order
 Gorguts
 Craft
 The 3rd Attempt
 Mistur
 Thaw
 Psycroptic
 Lucifer's Child
 Orkan
 Mork
 Scarred
 Abbysion
 Stahlsarg

2015 
The 2015 edition took place at Rockefeller Music Hall from 1. April (club night), to 4. April.
 1349
 ADE
 Arcturus
 Behemoth
 Bloodbath
 Crescent
 Enslaved
 Kampfar
 My Dying Bride
 Septicflesh
 Taake

2014 
The 2014 edition took place at Rockefeller Music Hall from 16. April (club night), to 19. April.

2013 
The 2013 edition took place at Rockefeller Music Hall from 27. March (club night), to 30. March.

2012 
The 2012 edition took place at Rockefeller Music Hall from 4. April (club night), to the 7. April.

2011
The 2011 edition took place at Rockefeller Music Hall from April 20 (club night), to April 23.

2010
The 2010 edition took place at Rockefeller Music Hall from March 31 (club night), to April 3.
 Nifrost
 Svarttjern
 Demonic Resurrection
 Spearhead, in replacement for The Psyke Project
 Nachtmystium
 Madder Mortem
 Eyehategod
 Belphegor
 Finntroll
 Marduk
 Throne of Katarsis
 Fortid
 Blodspor
 Obscura
 Ragnarok
 Mistur
 Ram-Zet
 Benediction
 Ihsahn
 Mayhem
 Como Muertos
 Sarkom
 Irr
 Exumer
 Necrophagist
 Årabrot
 Taake
 Deströyer 666
 The Kovenant
 Death Angel
 Scribe

2009
The 2009 edition took place at Rockefeller Music Hall from April 8 (club night), to April 11.
Carpathian Forest
Keep of Kalessin
Vreid
Paradise Lost
Negură Bunget
Samael
Septic Flesh
Pestilence
Pantheon I
Helheim
Kampfar
Koldbrann
Swallow the Sun
Dew-Scented
Troll
Code
Root
Black Comedy
Vicious Art
Grand Magus
Execration
Ramesses
Unearthly Trance
Taetre
Azarath
Kraanium
Episode 13
Seregon
The Battalion, in replacement for Meshuggah
Krypt
Sahg
Sarke
Mencea
Warlord UK

2008
1349
Gaahl and King ov Hell (under the name Gorgoroth)
Unleashed
Satyricon
Keep of Kalessin
Behemoth
Gallhammer
Destruction
Krux
Shining
Tulus
Tristania
Cult of Luna
Overkill
Skitliv
Krux
Obliteration
Gorefest
Onslaught
The Battalion
Dead to This World
Mortal Sin
Diskord
Negură Bunget
Vreid
Desecration

2007
The 2007 edition took place at Rockefeller Music Hall on April 5, April 6 and April 7.
Norwegian Metal All-Stars
Trinacria
Primordial
Zyklon
Suffocation
Fatal Demeanor
Karkadan
Unspoken
Paradigma
Watain
Red Harvest (After Sabbat cancelled)
God Dethroned
Sigh
Moonspell
Immortal
Ravencult
Ground Zero System
Rotten Sound
Legion of the Damned
Hecate Enthroned
Brutal Truth
Dødheimsgard
Dark Funeral
Tiamat
Sodom
Lobotomized
Resurrected
Blood Tsunami
Koldbrann
Anaal Nathrakh

Kick-off party
Allfader
Olm

2006
The 2006 edition took place at Rockefeller Music Hall and John Dee from the 13th to the 15th of April.
Battered
Bloodthorn
Bolt Thrower
Borknagar
Carpathian Forest
Cathedral
Demonizer
Disiplin
Dismember
Emperor
Endstille
Face Down
Funeral
Imbalance
Keep of Kalessin
Khold
Legion
Manngard
Marduk
Myrkskog
Nightrage
Rimfrost
Sahg
Susperia
System:Obscure
The Deviant
Usurper
Vesen
Waklevören
Witchcraft

2005
Amon Amarth
Arcturus
Aura Noir
Candlemass
Chton
Deceiver
Dissection
Gehenna
Grave
Green Carnation
Grimfist
Goatlord
Gorelord
Hatesphere
Horricane
Lamented Souls
Morbid Angel
Mortiis
Nebular Mystic
Naer mataron
Obliteration
Seth
She Said Destroy
Slogstorm
Sunn O)))
Tsjuder
Taakeferd
Vreid
Zeenon

2004
Aborym
Aeternus
Asmegin
Decapitated
Defiled
Dimension F3h
Disiplin
Enslaved
Forgery
Gorgoroth
Helheim
Holy Moses
Khold
Konkhra
Manes
Manifest
Mayhem
Maze of Torment
Mercenary
MindGrinder
My Dying Bride
Myrkskog
Pawnshop
Rotting Christ
Sadus
Sinners Bleed
Susperia
Tonka

2003
1349	
Alsvartr	
Audiopain	
Belphegor	
Cadaver	
Children of Bodom	
Deride	
Entombed	
Exmortem
Grand Alchemist	
Immortal	
Koldbrann	
Lost at Last	
Lumsk	
Madder Mortem	
N.C.O.	
Necrophagia	
Opeth	
Perished	
Ragnarok	
Raise Hell	
Red Harvest	
Runemagick	
Shadows Fall
Thyruz	
Sirenia	
Soilwork
The Allseeing I	
The Kovenant	
Taake	
Vader

2002
1349 	
Aeternus 	
Agressor 	
Behemoth 	
Black Comedy 	
Blood Red Throne 	
Carpathian Forest 	
Dimmu Borgir 	
Eternal Silence 	
Lock Up 	
Lost in Time 	
Lowdown 	
Manatark 	
Minas Tirith 	
Nocturnal Breed 	
Scariot 	
Source of Tide 	
Vintersorg 	
Windir 	
Witchery 	
Zection 8

2001
Audiopain
Bloodthorn
Borknagar
Burning Rubber
Cadaver Inc.
Crest of Darkness
Cybele
Enslaved
Farout Fishing
Gehenna
Hades Almighty
Khold
M-Eternal
Pain
Peccatum
Ram-Zet
Red Harvest
Susperia
Tidfall
Trail of Tears
Witchery
Zeenon
Zyklon

See also
 Beyond the Gates
 Hole in the Sky
 Midgardsblot

References

External links
Official site

Heavy metal festivals in Norway
Music festivals in Oslo
Music festivals established in 2001
Spring (season) events in Norway
Winter events in Norway